A perfect square is an element of algebraic structure that is equal to the square of another element.
 Square number, a perfect square integer

Entertainment 
 Perfect Square, a live recording by the band R.E.M.
 Perfect Square (publisher), a children's imprint label by Viz Media.

See also 
 Perfect square dissection, a dissection of a geometric square into smaller squares, all of different sizes
 Perfect square trinomials, a method of factoring polynomials